Aq Kupruk is a village in Balkh Province in northern Afghanistan.

Archaeological sites 
Aq Kupruk is also an archaeological site consists of four sites, numbered I, II, III and IV. 
 Aq Kupruk I, or Ghar-i Asb, is a rock shelter of the Kushan-Sasanian period, containing some fragmentary Buddhist frescos and some simple architecture.
 Aq Kupruk II, or Ghār-i Mār, is another rock shelter, probably the most productive of the three sites, producing material rom all periods except the Kushan-Sasanian. About 10% of the occupation area was excavated.
 Aq Kupruk III, is an open-air site on the river terrace consisting of two periods, both in the Epipalaeolithic.
 Aq Kupruk IV, was excavated briefly by McBurney nearer to the village, producing a "Middle Mousterian" type of industry differing to that found by Dupree.

Finds included an extensive and sophisticated stone tool industry, very early stone sculpture, domesticated sheep and goat remains, fragments of beaten copper from the ceramic  Neolithic, many projectile points, terracotta and simple jewellery.

Collections:
 AMNH - excavated material.
 BIAS - flint and stone.
 Kabul Museum - excavated material, stone head.

Field-work:
 1959 Dupree, American Universities Field Staff - survey.
 1960 Hayashi & Sahara, Kyoto University - survey.
 1962 & 65 Dupree, AMNH - excavations.
 1971 McBurney, Cambridge University - sondage.

See also 
Balkh Province

References

 Archaeological Gazetter of Afghanistan / Catalogue des Sites Archéologiques D'Afghanistan, Volume I, Warwick Ball, Editions Recherche sur les civilisations, Paris, 1982.

External links
Satellite map at Maplandia.com

Further reading 
 Hayashi and Sahara in Mizuno. S. (ed) 1962. Haibāk and Kashmir-Smast. Kyoto: 54–5, 105.
 Dupree, L. et al. 1972. Prehistoric Research in Afghanistan (1959-1966) (4.12). Philadelphia.
 McBurney, C.B.M. 1972. 'Report of an archaeological survey in northern Afghanistan'. July–August 1971'. Afghanistan 25, 2: 22–32.
 Davis in Allchin, R. and Hammond, N. (eds) 1978. The Archaeology of Afghanistan. London: 55–63.
 Shaffer in Allchin, R. and Hammond, N. (eds) 1978. The Archaeology of Afghanistan. London: 74–81, 89–90.
 Gupta, S.P. 1979. Archaeology of Soviet Central Asia and the Indian Borderlands (2 vol). New Delhi.
 Derevyenko and Liu Zun-E in Dani, A.H. and Masson, V.M. (eds) 1992. History of Civilizations of Central Asia (volume 1): The dawn of civilization - earliest times to 700 B.C. Paris.
 Sarianidi in Dani, A.H. and Masson, V.M. (eds) 1992. History of Civilizations of Central Asia (volume 1): The dawn of civilization - earliest times to 700 B.C. Paris.

Populated places in Balkh Province
Archaeological sites in Afghanistan
Asian archaeology
Neolithic
Mousterian
Epipalaeolithic